Jared Watts (born February 3, 1992) is a retired American professional soccer player who played as a defender.

Career

Youth career 
Watts spent time with North Meck SC as well as with the IMG Soccer Academy. He would attend Wake Forest University and was named first team All-Conference on 3 occasions; 2011, 2012, and 2013.

Colorado Rapids 
Watts was drafted in the second round (33rd overall) of the 2014 MLS SuperDraft by the Colorado Rapids.  He made his professional debut on March 29, 2014 against Sporting Kansas City. Watts scored his first professional goal on July 11, 2015 in a 3-1 win over Real Salt Lake. In 2016, Watts was a part of the best defense in MLS and helped the Rapids finish second in the Western Conference.  He would help the Rapids reach the Conference finals, where they fell to the Seattle Sounders.

On March 28, 2018, Watts was traded to Houston Dynamo in exchange for $100,000 of Targeted Allocation Money.

Houston Dynamo 
Watts made his Dynamo debut on May 30, 2018 in a 2-1 loss to Real Salt Lake. He suffered various injuries in 2018, forcing him to miss good chunks of the season.

International career
Watts captained the US at the 2009 FIFA U-17 World Cup in Nigeria. He also has had extensive international experience, seeing time with the U17 and U20 U.S. Youth National Teams. Played and was a captain with the U.S. U17 team.

Career statistics

Honors 
Houston Dynamo

 US Open Cup: 2018

References

External links

1992 births
Living people
American soccer players
Association football defenders
Colorado Rapids draft picks
Colorado Rapids players
Houston Dynamo FC players
Major League Soccer players
People from Statesville, North Carolina
Rio Grande Valley FC Toros players
Soccer players from North Carolina
USL Championship players
United States men's youth international soccer players
Wake Forest Demon Deacons men's soccer players